Tell-Tale is a 2009 science fiction horror film inspired by Edgar Allan Poe's 1843 short story "The Tell-Tale Heart". It is directed by Michael Cuesta and stars Josh Lucas, Lena Headey, and Brian Cox and is produced by Tony Scott and Ridley Scott.  A man's recently transplanted heart leads him on a frantic search to find the donor's killer before a similar fate befalls him.

Plot

In Providence, a husband and his wife die in a botched robbery; we see flickers of his last memories. His heart goes to Terry Bernard, a single father raising a girl with a rare degenerative disease. After the operation, Terry has flashes of memory from the last moments of the dead donor's life. Then, he recognizes one of the donor's killers and follows him into an alley. Within days, Terry becomes an unwilling avenger, with a police detective on his trail. Meanwhile, he begins a romance with his daughter's doctor, his moods complicated by memory flashes, the donor's deepening presence in both Terry's mind and body, and the unexplained bond among the donor's killers. Can this end well?

Cast

Production

Release

The film received a DVD and Blu-ray Disc release on 25 May 2010.

Reception

References

External links

2000s thriller films
2009 films
2009 horror films
British horror thriller films
American horror thriller films
Films about organ trafficking
Films based on The Tell-Tale Heart
Films directed by Michael Cuesta
Films with screenplays by David Callaham
Films scored by David Buckley
2000s English-language films
2000s American films
2000s British films